Cranbrook was a rural district in Kent, England. In 1974 the district was merged into the Borough of Tunbridge Wells. 

The district covered Cranbrook and the surrounding villages of Benenden,  Frittenden, Goudhurst, Hawkhurst, Sandhurst and Sissinghurst.

References

Rural districts of England
Borough of Tunbridge Wells
Hawkhurst